Angle Inlet is a census-designated place (CDP) and unincorporated community in Angle Township, Lake of the Woods County, Minnesota, United States. Its population was 54 as of the 2020 census. The community is part of the Northwest Angle, the only place in the contiguous United States north of the 49th parallel; it is the northernmost census-designated place in the contiguous United States. The French built Fort Saint Charles nearby in 1732.

Angle Inlet has the last one-room school in the state and a post office with a sign stating that it is the "Most Northerly P.O. in Contiguous U.S." To travel to Angle Inlet from other parts of Minnesota by road requires driving through Manitoba, Canada.

Demographics
In the 2020 US Census Angle Inlet's population was approximately 110.

Climate

Angle Inlet has a warm-summer humid continental climate (Dfb), with a plant hardiness zone of 3b with an average annual extreme minimum temperature of -32.6 °F (-35.9 °C). Due to its high latitude and being in the middle of a continent, it is a contender for the most extreme winters in the contiguous United States.

There is no weather station in the area, but the PRISM Climate Group, a project of Oregon State University, provides interpolated data for the area based on the climates of nearby areas.

References

Census-designated places in Lake of the Woods County, Minnesota
Census-designated places in Minnesota
Enclaves and exclaves]
Unincorporated communities in Lake of the Woods County, Minnesota
Unincorporated communities in Minnesota